Pongsiri P.K. Saenchai Muaythaigym, is a Thai Muay Thai kickboxer.

Muay Thai career
He fought Phetmorakot Petchyindee Academy for the inaugural ONE Featherweight Muay Thai World Championship at ONE Championship: Warrior's Code on February 7, 2020. Phetmorakot won by unanimous decision.

He was scheduled to fight Phonaek Or Kwanmuang in the Prachinburi event in the Omnoi Stadium, in March 2020. The fight was for the Omnoi Stadium −147 lbs title. Pongsiri won by decision.

He fought Sorgraw Petchyindee during ONE Championship: No Surrender 2 on August 14, 2020, and lost the bout by split decision.

Pongsiri was scheduled to fight Sean Clancy during ONE Championship: A New Breed 2 on September 11, 2020. Pongsiri won the fight by unanimous decision.

Pongsiri is scheduled to face Liam Harrison at ONE on TNT 2 on April 14, 2021. However, their fight was pulled from the event after the COVID-19 situation in the United Kingdom prevented Harrison from traveling.

Pongsiri faced former ONE Bantamweight Kickboxing World Champion Alaverdi Ramazanov at ONE Championship: NextGen 3 on November 26, 2021. He lost by first-round knockout.

Pongsiri was scheduled to face Liam Harrison on January 14, 2023, at ONE Fight Night 6. However, Harrison withdrew from the event due to injuries and requiring surgery. As a result, the bout was scrapped.

Pongsiri faced Ferzan Çiçek on January 27, 2023, at ONE Friday Fights 2. He won the fight via unanimous decision.

Pongsiri is scheduled to face Tyson Harrison on March 31, 2023, at ONE Friday Fights 11.

Titles and accomplishments

Professional Boxing Association of Thailand (PAT) 
 2007 Thailand 112 lbs Champion
Lumpinee Stadium
2007 Lumpinee Stadium 112 lbs Champion
2016 Lumpinee Stadium 147 lbs Champion 
Channel 7 Stadium
2016 Channel 7 Stadium 147 lbs Champion
World Professional Muaythai Federation
2017 WPMF World 154 lbs Champion
Phoenix FC
 2018 Phoenix FC 154 lbs Champion
Omnoi Stadium
2020 Omnoi Stadium 147 lbs Champion

Fight record

|-  style="background:#cfc;"
| 2023-01-27|| Win ||align=left| Ferzan Cicek ||  ONE Friday Fights 2, Lumpinee Stadium || Bangkok, Thailand || Decision (Unanimous) || 3 || 3:00
|-  style="background:#fbb;"
| 2022-10-22 || Loss||align=left| Pasquale G.Amoroso || The King of the Ring 7 || Cesinali, Italy || Decision|| 5 ||3:00  
|-
! style=background:white colspan=9 |
|- style="background:#cfc;"
| 2022-07-08 || Win ||align=left| Fabio Venum Camp || Muay Thai Fighter X || Pathum Thani, Thailand || Decision || 5 || 3:00
|- style="background:#cfc;"
| 2022-03-19 || Win ||align=left| Mohammad Siasarani || Muay Thai Fighter X || Prachuap Khiri Khan, Thailand || Decision || 5 || 3:00
|- style="background:#fbb;"
| 2022-02-19 || Loss ||align=left| Mohammad Siasarani || Muay Thai Fighter X || Prachuap Khiri Khan, Thailand || Decision || 5 || 3:00
|- style="background:#fbb;"
| 2021-11-26 || Loss ||align=left| Alaverdi Ramazanov || ONE Championship: NextGen III || Kallang, Singapore || KO (Punch) || 1 || 2:39
|-  style="background:#fbb;"
| 2020-11-29 || Loss ||align=left| Saemapetch Fairtex || Channel 7 Stadium  || Bangkok, Thailand || KO || 3 ||
|-  style="background:#cfc"
| 2020-09-11|| Win|| align=left| Sean Clancy || ONE Championship: A New Breed 2 || Bangkok, Thailand || Decision (Unanimous)  || 3 || 3:00
|-  style="background:#fbb;"
| 2020-08-14 || Loss ||align=left| Sorgraw Petchyindee ||  ONE Championship: No Surrender 2  || Bangkok, Thailand || Decision (Split)|| 3 ||  3:00
|-  style="background:#cfc;"
| 2020-03-07 || Win ||align=left| Phonek Or.Kwanmuang || SuekJaoMuayThai, Omnoi Stadium || Samut Sakhon, Thailand || Decision  || 5 || 3:00 
|-
! style=background:white colspan=9 |

|-  style="background:#cfc;"
| 2020-01-16 || Win ||align=left| Phonek Or.Kwanmuang || SuekJaoMuayThai, Omnoi Stadium || Samut Sakhon, Thailand || Decision  || 5 || 3:00 

|-  style="background:#fbb;"
| 2020-02-07 || Loss||align=left| Phetmorakot Petchyindee Academy || ONE Championship: Warrior's Code || Jakarta, Indonesia || Decision (Unanimous) || 5 || 3:00 
|-
! style=background:white colspan=9 |
|-  bgcolor="#cfc"
| 2019-12-24 || Win|| align=left| Singsuriya PornchaiPlazaRomKlao || Tded99, Lumpinee Stadium || Bangkok, Thailand || Decision || 5 || 3:00
|-  style="background:#fbb;"
| 2019-11-07 || Loss ||align=left| Phonek Or.Kwanmuang || Ruamponkon Prachin || Prachinburi Province, Thailand || Decision  || 5 || 3:00
|-  bgcolor="#cfc"
| 2019-07-30 || Win|| align=left| Singsuriya PornchaiPlazaRomKlao || PK Saenchai + SorJor.TongPrachin, Lumpinee Stadium || Bangkok, Thailand || Decision || 5 || 3:00
|-  bgcolor="#cfc"
| 2019-06-20 || Win|| align=left| Singsuriya PornchaiPlazaRomKlao || Sor.Sommai, Rajadamnern Stadium || Bangkok, Thailand || Decision || 5 || 3:00
|-  bgcolor="#fbb"
| 2019-04-12 || Loss|| align=left| Meun Sophea || Bayon boxing || Cambodia || KO (Low Kicks)|| 2 || 2:45
|-  bgcolor="#c5d2ea"
| 2019-03-23 || Draw|| align=left| Long Sophy || Seatv Kun Khmer || Cambodia || Decision || 5 || 3:00
|-  bgcolor="#cfc"
| 2019-03-17 || Win|| align=left| Avatar Tor.Morsri || Chang MuayThai Kiatpetch, OrTorGor.3 Stadium || Nonthaburi Province, Thailand || Decision || 5 || 3:00
|-  bgcolor="#fbb"
| 2019-02-11 || Loss || align=left| Kaito Ono || SHOOT BOXING 2019 act.1 || Tokyo, Japan || Decision (Unanimous)|| 5 || 3:00
|-  bgcolor="#cfc"
| 2018-12-23 || Win || align=left| Marlon Santos || Topking World Series  || Thailand || Decision || 3 || 3:00
|-  bgcolor="#fbb"
| 2018-10-28 || Loss|| align=left| Chadd Collins || Topking World Series || Thailand || Decision || 3 || 3:00
|-  bgcolor="#cfc"
| 2018-10-05 || Win|| align=left| Reza Ahmadnezhad|| Muay Nai Khanom Tom – Muay Thai Expo || Buriram, Thailand || Decision || 3 || 3:00
|-  style="background:#cfc;"
| 2018-08-29 || Win||align=left| Shinji Suzuki || Suk Wan Kingtong "Go to Raja" || Tokyo, Japan || Decision (Unanimous) || 5 || 3:00
|-  bgcolor="#cfc"
| 2018-07-15 || Win|| align=left| Avatar Tor.Morsri || MuayThaiJedsee, Channel 7 Stadium || Bangkok, Thailand || Decision || 5 || 3:00
|-  style="background:#cfc;"
| 2018-05-22 || Win||align=left| Rafi Bohic || Phoenix 8, Lumpinee Stadium || Bangkok, Thailand || Decision || 5 || 3:00
|-
! style=background:white colspan=9 |
|-  style="background:#cfc;"
| 2018-04-21 || Win||align=left| Cristian Marzullo || Thai Fight|| Roma, Italy || KO (Right Elbow) || 2 ||
|-  style="background:#cfc;"
| 2018-03-24 || Win||align=left| Victor Conesa || Thai Fight || Spain || TKO (Punches) || 2 ||
|-  bgcolor="#fbb"
| 2018-02-18 || Loss|| align=left| Manachai YokkaoMuayThai || MuayThaiJedsee, Channel 7 Stadium || Bangkok, Thailand || Decision || 5 || 3:00
|-  style="background:#cfc;"
| 2017-12-16 || Win||align=left| Samuel Bark || WPMF King's Birthday || Thailand || Decision || 5 || 3:00
|-
! style=background:white colspan=9 |
|-  bgcolor="#fbb"
| 2017-10-15 || Loss ||align=left| Jordan Watson  || Yokkao 28 || Bolton, England || KO (Head Kick) || 2 || 3:00
|-
! style=background:white colspan=9 |
|-  style="background:#c5d2ea;"
| 2017-09-30 || Draw||align=left| Samuel Bark || Top King 16 || Fujian, China || Decision || 3 || 3:00
|-  style="background:#cfc;"
| 2017-09-10 || Win ||align=left| Rafi Bohic || Lumpinee Stadium || Bangkok, Thailand || Decision || 5 || 3:00
|-  style="background:#cfc;"
| 2017-08-05 || Win||align=left| Craig Dickson || Top King 15 || Thailand || Decision || 3 || 3:00
|-  style="background:#fbb;"
| 2017-06-17 || Loss ||align=left| Rafi Bohic || Lumpinee Stadium || Bangkok, Thailand || Decision || 5 || 3:00
|-
! style=background:white colspan=9 |
|-  style="background:#fbb;"
| 2017-06-17 || Loss ||align=left| Nontakit Tor.Morsri || Kiatpetch + PKsaenchai promotion, Lumpinee Stadium || Bangkok, Thailand || Decision || 5 || 3:00
|-  style="background:#fbb;"
| 2017-03-19 || Loss ||align=left| Nontakit Tor.Morsri || Channel 7 Stadium || Bangkok, Thailand || Decision || 5 || 3:00
|-
! style=background:white colspan=9 |
|-  style="background:#cfc;"
| 2016-12-18 || Win ||align=left| Vinailek Sor.Jor.Vichitpadriew ||  Chiang Mai Boxing Stadium || Chiang Mai, Thailand || Decision || 5 || 3:00
|-  style="background:#cfc;"
| 2016-10-07 || Win ||align=left| Rafi Bohic || Lumpinee Stadium || Bangkok, Thailand || Decision || 5 || 3:00
|-  style="background:#cfc;"
| 2016-09-02 || Win ||align=left| Rafi Bohic || Lumpinee Stadium || Bangkok, Thailand || Decision || 5 || 3:00
|-
! style=background:white colspan=9 |
|-  bgcolor="#cfc"
| 2016-08-16 || Win || align=left| Valentin Thibaut || Fighting Man || China || Decision || 5 || 3:00
|-  style="background:#cfc;"
| 2016-07-24 || Win ||align=left| Nontakit Tor.Morsri || Channel 7 Stadium || Bangkok, Thailand || Decision || 5 || 3:00
|-  style="background:#cfc;"
| 2016-06-28 || Win ||align=left| Simanut Sor.Sarinya ||  || Phang Nga Province, Thailand || Decision || 5 || 3:00
|-  style="background:#fbb;"
| 2016-05-01 || Loss||align=left| Simanut Sor.Sarinya || Jitmuangnon Stadium || Bangkok, Thailand || Decision || 5 || 3:00
|-  style="background:#cfc;"
| 2016-03-20 || Win ||align=left| Simanut Sor.Sarinya || Channel 7 Stadium || Bangkok, Thailand || Decision || 5 || 3:00
|-
! style=background:white colspan=9 |
|-  style="background:#cfc;"
| 2016-02-21 || Win ||align=left| Simanut Sor.Sarinya || Jitmuangnon Stadium || Bangkok, Thailand || Decision || 5 || 3:00
|-  style="background:#fbb;"
| 2016-12-18 || Loss ||align=left| Vinailek Sor.Jor.Vichitpadriew ||  || Buriram, Thailand || Decision || 5 || 3:00
|-  style="background:#cfc;"
| 2015-12-20 || Win ||align=left| Vinailek Sor.Jor.Vichitpadriew || Jitmuangnon Stadium || Bangkok, Thailand || Decision || 5 || 3:00
|-  style="background:#cfc;"
| 2015-11-08 || Win ||align=left| Phetmakok Sitdabmai  || Channel 7 Stadium || Bangkok, Thailand || Decision || 5 || 3:00
|-  bgcolor="#fbb"
| 2015-07-19 || Loss || align=left| Bird Kham || SeaTV Khmer Thai Boxing || Cambodia || Decision || 5 || 3:00
|-  bgcolor="#fbb"
| 2014-07-20 || Loss || align=left| Tsukuru Midorikawa || SNKA MAGNUM 35 || Tokyo, Japan || Decision (Unanimous)|| 5 || 3:00
|-  style="background:#cfc;"
| 2010-01-01|| Win||align=left| Silpachai Sakulrattana || Petchyindee, Lumpinee Stadium || Bangkok, Thailand || Decision || 5 || 3:00

|-  style="background:#cfc;"
| 2009-11-28|| Win||align=left| Silpachai Sakulrattana || Omnoi Stadium || Samut Sakhon, Thailand || Decision || 5 || 3:00

|-  style="background:#fbb;"
| 2009-10-07|| Loss ||align=left| Dechrit Sor Thanayong || Daorung, Rajadamnern Stadium || Bangkok, Thailand || Decision || 5 || 3:00

|-  style="background:#fbb;"
| 2009-07-29|| Loss ||align=left| Fasathan Kor.Saphaothong || Kiatsingnoi, Rajadamnern Stadium || Bangkok, Thailand ||KO || 3 ||

|-  style="background:#fbb;"
| 2009-05-12|| Loss ||align=left| Dechrit Sor Thanayong || Lumpinee Stadium || Bangkok, Thailand || Decision || 5 || 3:00

|-  style="background:#fbb;"
| 2009-03-05|| Loss ||align=left| Palangtip Kor Sapaothong || Lumpinee Stadium || Bangkok, Thailand || KO || 5 ||

|-  style="background:#fbb;"
| 2009-02-07|| Loss ||align=left| Palangtip Kor Sapaothong || Lumpinee Stadium || Bangkok, Thailand || Decision || 5 || 3:00

|-  style="background:#c5d2ea;"
| 2009-01-10|| Draw||align=left| Saenkeng Nopparat || Jao Muay Thai, Omnoi Stadium || Samut Sakhon, Thailand || Decision || 5 || 3:00

|-  style="background:#fbb;"
| 2008-09-25|| Loss ||align=left| Wirayut Lukphetnoi|| Rajadamnern Stadium || Bangkok, Thailand || Decision || 5 || 3:00

|-  style="background:#cfc;"
| 2008-05-06|| Win ||align=left| Khunponjiew Saengsawangphantpla|| Petchyindee, Lumpinee Stadium || Bangkok, Thailand || Decision || 5 || 3:00

|-  style="background:#fbb;"
| 2008-03-28 || Loss ||align=left| Panomroonglek Kiatmoo9 ||Lumpinee Stadium || Thailand || Decision || 5 || 3:00
|-
! style=background:white colspan=9 |

|-  style="background:#cfc;"
| 2008-02-05|| Win ||align=left| Hokun Sitkruwat || Krikkrai, Lumpinee Stadium || Bangkok, Thailand || Decision || 5 || 3:00

|-  style="background:#cfc;"
| 2007-12-07|| Win ||align=left| Norasing Lukbanyai || Lumpinee 51st Anniversary, Lumpinee Stadium || Bangkok, Thailand || Decision || 5 || 3:00
|-
! style=background:white colspan=9 |
|-  style="background:#cfc;"
| 2007-09-28|| Win||align=left| Saeksan Or. Kwanmuang || Lumpinee Stadium || Bangkok, Thailand || Decision || 5 || 3:00
|-
! style=background:white colspan=9 |

|-  style="background:#fbb;"
| 2007-06-22|| Loss ||align=left| Saeksan Or. Kwanmuang || Phetsupapan, Lumpinee Stadium || Bangkok, Thailand || Decision || 5 || 3:00

|-  style="background:#fbb;"
| 2007-04-23|| Loss ||align=left| Saeksan Or. Kwanmuang || Sor Sommai, Rajadamnern Stadium || Bangkok, Thailand || Decision || 5 || 3:00

|-  style="background:#cfc;"
| 2007-02-13||Win ||align=left| Yodratchan Kiatbanphot || Petchpiya, Lumpinee Stadium || Bangkok, Thailand || Decision|| 5 ||3:00

|-  style="background:#;"
| 2007-01-08|| ||align=left| Hokun Sitkruwat || Lumpinee Stadium || Bangkok, Thailand || ||  ||

|-  style="background:#fbb;"
| 2006-11-10|| Loss ||align=left| Nasilek Sor.Bonliang || Lumpinee Stadium || Bangkok, Thailand || Decision || 5 || 3:00

|-  style="background:#cfc;"
| 2006-10-06|| Win ||align=left| Lek Thanasuranakorn || EminentAir, Lumpinee Stadium || Bangkok, Thailand || Decision || 5 || 3:00

|-  style="background:#cfc;"
| 2006-08-04|| Win ||align=left| Petchboonchuay Borplaboonchu || Petchyindee, Lumpinee Stadium || Bangkok, Thailand || Decision || 5 || 3:00

|-  style="background:#fbb;"
| 2006-06-08|| Loss ||align=left| Khaosod KilaAngthong || Daorung, Rajadamnern Stadium || Bangkok, Thailand || Decision || 5 || 3:00

|-  style="background:#cfc;"
| 2006-05-05|| Win ||align=left| Yodpoj Sor.Skawarat || Lumpinee Stadium || Bangkok, Thailand || Decision || 5 || 3:00

|-  style="background:#cfc;"
| 2006-03-09|| Win ||align=left| Krij KilaThungSong || Daorung, Rajadamnern Stadium || Bangkok, Thailand || Decision || 5 || 3:00

|-  style="background:#fbb;"
| 2006-02-10|| Loss ||align=left| Burengnong Romsrithong || Fairtex, Lumpinee Stadium || Bangkok, Thailand || Decision || 5 || 3:00

|-  style="background:#cfc;"
| 2006-01-10|| Win ||align=left| Burengnong Romsrithong || Daorung, Rajadamnern Stadium || Bangkok, Thailand || Decision || 5 || 3:00
|-
| colspan=9 | Legend:

Lethwei record

|- style="background:#c5d2ea;"
| 2020-01-19 || Draw || align="left" | Soe Lin Oo || Win Sein Taw Ya 2020 || Mudon Township, Myanmar || Draw || 5 || 3:00
|-
| colspan=9 | Legend:

References

Pongsiri P.K.Saenchaimuaythaigym
Living people
1990 births
ONE Championship kickboxers
Pongsiri P.K.Saenchaimuaythaigym